The Chinese Ambassador to Monaco is the official representative of the People's Republic of China to Monaco.

List of representatives

Consuls

Ambassadors

See also

References 

Ambassadors of China to Monaco
Monaco
China